Amor en custodia may refer to:
 Amor en custodia (Argentine TV series), 2005
 Amor en custodia (Mexican TV series), 2005–2006, based on the above
 Amor en custodia (Colombian TV series), 2009